In the latter half of the 19th century, private water systems began to be a part of municipal services. As of 2011, over three quarters of US local governments surveyed by the ICMA (International City/County Management Association) provide water distribution entirely
with public employees. Over two thirds of municipalities provide water treatment publicly, and over half provide sewage collection and treatment publicly. These rates have remained relatively stable over time.

The increased interest in privatizing public water services is an outgrowth of political forces and public policies favoring privatization of public services generally, and water resources specifically. A growing number of contracts to privatize public water services is an indicator that privatization has become increasingly attractive to many public water institutions. State legal authority for public entities to privatize water systems has aided the privatization trend. States have enacted statutes authorizing municipalities and other public entities to enter into contracts with private entities to supply water to the public.

Water corporations have identified United States public systems as potentially profitable. These are United Water, a subsidiary of the French company Suez Environment, American Water, and Siemens from Germany which acquired US Filter Corps from French Veolia Environment and runs it under the Siemens name.

Criticism
In "Water Privatization Trends in the United States: Human Rights, National Security, and Public Stewardship", Craig Anthony Arnold argues that there is a lack of incentive for private water companies to carry out improvements or maintenance in public water systems that will have lasting benefits beyond their contract term.

There are other criticisms of privatization outside the classic argument of "public" versus "private", the most of fundamental example being the claim that privatization does not lead to cost savings. Mildred Warner, a professor in the Department of City and Regional Planning at Cornell University and expert of government service delivery and privatization, completed a comprehensive analysis of all published water distribution studies published between 1960 and 2009. She and her colleagues found no evidence for cost savings.

Other criticisms come from a potential loss of equality provided by the privatization of water. In the early 19th century, the majority of the water supply in the United States was privatized. However, there were problems with privatization at this time. Water provisions were focused more towards wealthier communities and the poorer areas were sometimes ignored. Additionally, the private companies tended to focus more on profit maximization than on the quality and quantity of service provided because water is a natural monopoly. Because of this, by 2000 only 15% of water supply remained privatized.

There have also been multiple examples of privatization contracts being terminated by the government. One such contract was a 20-year contract in Atlanta with United Water in 1998. This contract was terminated after 4 years due to poor quality supplied and mismanagement issues.

Another argument against privatization in the U.S. is for security reasons. Arnold writes, "The critical dependence of the U.S. public on public water supply systems, surface waters, groundwater, and water infrastructure heighten the vulnerability of these systems not only to conflict and scarcity but also to terrorism and intentional harm. Therefore, we require savvy, farreaching, effective government oversight of our water supplies and facilities for their security. Decentralized private control of waters and water systems complicates the government's attempts to fulfill this responsibility."

Furthermore, some argue that the privatization of water gives up governmental control of a good that is essential to life and is ethically wrong. Commodifying water through privatization makes it a good to be bought and sold rather than a good that people have a natural right to, which has led to a loss of access to this resource in areas.

Support
Private water companies have existed in the United States for more than 200 years and number in the thousands today. The private water industry serves more than 73 million Americans. According to the National Association of Water Companies (NAWC), more than 2,000 facilities operate in public-private partnership contract arrangements. Data from Public Works Financing shows that 5,391 private water contracts came up for renewal from 2000 to 2015 and 97 percent were renewed within the industry.

Within the United States, there is widespread, bipartisan support for the role of private water in improving infrastructure and delivering safe drinking water. The U.S. Conference of Mayors Urban Water Council, the National League of Cities, the Brookings Institution, and the White House have said that private water companies provide proven and important options for municipalities facing urgent water infrastructure and operational needs.

Private water companies enable communities to gain access to needed capital for infrastructure investment. Each year, private water companies invest billions of dollars to improve water systems, conduct research, and develop new technologies. A water system run by the private sector can be more efficient and cost effective. Libertarian organizations such as the Reason Foundation have argued that privatizing water systems increases environmental compliance and reduces bureaucratic inefficiency, citing how studies have shown privatizing utility ownership or management reduces costs. In addition, private utilities contribute via taxes to the economies of municipalities they serve.

The largest private water utilities have fewer EPA violations, fines, or work orders when it comes to compliance with the Safe Drinking Water Act. An American Water Intelligence analysis of EPA data from 2001 to 2011 shows that NAWC members had 0.09 EPA enforcement actions per 1 million customers, while all other water operators had 30.03 EPA enforcement actions per 1 million customers. According to an analysis of EPA data from 2010 to 2013, publicly operated water systems are more likely to incur health violations of the Safe Drinking Water Act than privately operated water systems. According to Governing, public water employees are more likely to suffer an injury or illness on the job than private sector water employees.

Impact of private sector participation
In 2004 The University of Michigan's Center for Local, State, and Urban Policy published a policy report  regarding privatization, the pros and cons, and its impact on local and state government in the United States. A summary of their conclusions follows:

Private providers may or may not be more efficient than public providers. Whether privatization leads to greater cost savings depends largely on whether there is competition in service provision.
The quality of privatized services may or may not be higher than publicly provided services. Governments can play an important quality assurance role by monitoring and evaluating the delivery of privatized services.
In developing and transitional economies, privatization may reduce access to goods and services, particularly for low-income groups. Comparable studies need to be conducted to assess the distributional consequences of privatization programs in the United States.
Privatization might lead to more rational labor market policies. However, the employment effects of privatization are more nuanced than commonly assumed by either proponents or opponents of privatization. Privatization tends to lead to substitution of high-skill for low-skill workers and reduction in total employment levels, but no change in net wages.
Political considerations strongly influence both if and how policymakers contract-out services to private providers.

"While many states and localities are turning to privatization as a way to provide services to their citizens, surprisingly little is known about these choices.  Much of the debate over privatization pays little attention to the rationales and consequences of private versus public service provision."

Cases of water privatization

Atlanta

In January 1999, the city of Atlanta, Georgia, entered into a 20-year contract with United Water Resources Inc. to run its drinking water system. On January 24, 2003, because hundreds of residents had complained of brown water and poor service since the city agreed to the privatization contract, Atlanta terminated its contract with United Water. At the time, this was the nation's largest public-private partnership contract. But Mayor Shirley Franklin, who took office after the deal was signed, canceled the contract. The water problems of Atlanta and Georgia have extended far beyond how to run municipal systems to problems of water scarcity and Conflict with neighboring towns and states.(see Tri-state water dispute) 

Atlanta Georgia has found itself in a water crisis due to legal and political institutions' accommodation of consumer demand for both water and energy produced by water: a growing population particularly in the sprawling Atlanta metropolitan area, recreational users of water, agricultural irrigators, power generators, and industries like pulp and paper mills, textiles, chemical manufacturing facilities, and the mining industry.

Detroit

The experiences in Detroit provide some perspective on what happens with corrupt government related to public or private participation.
Public officials were indicted for illegally steering public contracts to specific private companies. These companies also were accused of questionable billing practices. According to the Detroit Free Press, The sprawling water system (Detroit's), with more than 4 million customers and annual revenues of more than $800 million, stretches from Lake Huron in north eastern Michigan to the town of Ypsilanti Michigan, a Detroit suburb to the south west of Detroit. This sprawling water system has provided a "flash point between the city and the suburbs because Detroit owns the system although about three-quarters of the customers now live in the suburbs." Also according to the Detroit Free Press, suburban leaders have long criticized the Detroit Water and Sewerage Department for its annual rate increases and what many considered questionable contracting practices. Due to the horse trading, shoddy contracting practices, and other forms of corruption this Detroit case may be a good example of government failure in the water system arena.

, the Detroit Water and Sewerage Department is 
"an estimated $5 billion in debt and has been the subject of privatization talks ... [it] says half of its 323,000 accounts are delinquent and has begun turning off the taps of those who do not pay bills that total above $150 or that are 60 days late. Since March, up to 3,000 account holders have had their water cut off every week."
Activists have criticized these actions, saying "Detroit is trying to push through a private takeover of its water system at the expense of basic rights." The Blue Planet Project has filed a "submission to the United Nations Special Rapporteur on the human right to safe drinking water and sanitation regarding cutting off water to Detroit residents.

Emmaus, Pennsylvania 

On July 6, 2005, the Emmaus Borough Council voted in a 3-2 vote to authorize its Water Committee to work with the borough's consultant to draft an agreement of sale for its water system. Citizens had been especially concerned that if the borough chose to follow the consultant's advice to "monetize the system," that the system would be sold to a multinational corporation, as was an increasing trend throughout the region. Many Emmaus residents organized themselves under the group EFLOW ("Emmaus for Locally Owned Water"), and through a combination of letter-writing, petitioning and public comment at council meetings, in early September 2005 the council voted to take water privatization off the table of options. This controversy garnered regional and national attention, with anti-privatization non-profits such as Public Citizen noting the debate and outcome.

Indianapolis

On August 26, 2011, the city of Indianapolis transferred its water and waste water systems to a non-profit charitable trust known as Citizens Energy Group, for more than $1.9 billion. Under the terms of the transfer, the City transferred all of the debt of those two systems to Citizens and received more than $500 million, which the city has used to fund upgrades to transportation infrastructure, improvements to city parks, and removal of abandoned homes.

References

United States
Water supply and sanitation in the United States
Privatization in the United States